Brunhilda is a genus of small seed-eating birds in the waxbill family Estrildidae. The species are found in Sub-Saharan Africa.

Taxonomy
The genus Brunhilda was introduced in 1862 by the German naturalist Ludwig Reichenbach for the black-faced waxbill. Brunhild is a female character of Germanic and Norse legend. The genus was considered as a junior synonym of Estrilda but was resurrected when a molecular phylogenetic study published in 2020 found that Estrilda was paraphyletic.

Species
The genus contains two species:

References

Waxbills
Bird genera
 
Brunhilda (bird)